The ASCAP Richard Rodgers New Horizons Award is an annual award presented by the American Society of Composers, Authors and Publishers, in recognition of achievement by the best new composers of musical theater.

The award was established in 1996, by Mary Rodgers in honor of her late father Richard Rodgers. Winners have included Eric Whitacre, Andrew Lippa, and James McBride.

Award recipients

External links
 Official list of award-winners, at ASCAP.com 

American music awards